Choi Seungno or Choi Seung-ro (927 – 17 June 989 was a politician, Confucian scholar, poet, and literary writer in the early Goryeo dynasty. He came from the Gyeongju Choe clan, one of the third class noble families of Silla. He was famous for dedicating 28 duties to King Seongjong, most of which were accepted and a became an important basis for state affairs such as Goryeo's political system and local government.

Life
Choi Seungno was born in Gyeongju. He was the son of Silla noble Choi Eunham. Since the age of 12, he had been highly praised by Taejo of Goryeo. He spread Confucianism widely in Korea and set up the basic political structure of Goryeo at the era of Seongjong. According to his Choi, Seongjong accepted the ruling system of Later Zhou of China and threw away its traditional ruling system. Seongjong installed 12 provincial capitals and 3 small capitals which were Seoul, Gyeongju and Pyongyang.

In 988, he was titled marquis of Chungha.

Poetry
He composed "a significant corpus of poems".

In popular culture
Portrayed by Lee Ji-hyung in the 2002–2003 KBS1 TV series The Dawn of the Empire.

See also
 Goryeo
 Seongjong of Goryeo

References

Cited works
 Mair, Victor H. (ed.) (2001). The Columbia History of Chinese Literature. New York: Columbia University Press. . (Amazon Kindle edition.)

927 births
989 deaths
Korean male poets
Goryeo Buddhists
10th-century Korean poets
People from Gyeongju
10th-century Korean philosophers